Mr Sufian (born October 25, 1994), a Moroccan pop and R&B singer and songwriter from Tangier.

Biography
As a kid coming from Tangier, one of the few cities in Morocco that they accepted the "Musiqa Ashabab" which it means Music of Youth, The young singer interested in the occidental music and especially in R&B and pop music, he is more influenced by young biggest American artists like Chris Brown, Usher and others.

He started his career in 2010, with his debut single "Awel Hob", which it had a good impression by his fans and gained the top of the classment in "Reverbantion – Top R&B aux Maroc". In 2011 he released his 5th single "Smaheli Bezaf" with a music video. He is one of the few artists that are influenced by the American music style. He is the first Moroccan artist who got signed by Vevo & Sony Music. He has made the first Moroccan Dubstep song and his debut album is already available on stores all around the world.

Discography

Albums 
 2013: Awel Hob

Singles
2010
Awel Hob
Dayman F’Bali

2011
Ana Wiyak
Smahli Bezaf
3ayesh Ghrib

2012
Joj F’Had Dnya
A’ish Hyatek  
Beslama
Sehrouni Ayounek

2013
Mazal Liyam
3mel Lkhir (Ft. Amir L9wafi)

Music videos
Smahli Bezaf (2011)
Awel Hob (2012) 
Mazal Liyam (2013)

References

External links
 Vevo
 Official website
 Skyrock 

1994 births
Living people
21st-century Moroccan male singers
Moroccan pop singers
People from Tangier